Two-cent coin or two-cent piece may refer to:
 Two-cent coin (Australia)
 Two-cent coin (New Zealand)
 Two-cent piece (United States), a historical U.S. coin
 2 cent euro coin
 Two-cent coin, a coin of the South African rand